Frederick Bailey Deeming (30 July 1853 – 23 May 1892) was an English-born Australian murderer. He was convicted and executed for the murder of a woman in Melbourne, Australia. He is remembered today because he was suspected by some of being the notorious serial killer Jack the Ripper.

Early life and first murders
Deeming was born in Ashby-de-la-Zouch, Leicestershire, England, son of Thomas Deeming, brazier, and his wife Ann (née Bailey). He was a "difficult child" according to writers Maurice Gurvich and Christopher Wray. At 16 years of age, he ran away to sea, and thereafter he began a long career of crime, largely thieving and obtaining money under false pretenses. He was also responsible for the murder of his first wife Marie and his four children at Rainhill, England, on or about 26 July 1891, and a second wife, Emily Mather, at Windsor, Melbourne, on 24 December 1891.
 
Less than three months elapsed between the discovery of Mather's body in Windsor, Melbourne, in March 1892, and Deeming's execution for her murder in May 1892; a remarkably short time by comparison to modern western legal standards. This was not only due to efficient police work, but also a result of the considerable international media interest the murder attracted. For example, it was an English journalist working for the Melbourne Argus who first approached Mather's mother in Rainhill and delivered the news of her daughter's murder. Another factor was Deeming's behaviour in public, for while he often used different names, he usually drew attention to himself with behaviour variously described as aggressive, ostentatious, ingratiating and overly attentive to women.

Australia in the 1880s
Police investigations after his arrest in 1892 revealed that Deeming had moved to Australia in 1882, chiefly working in Sydney, but also working for John Danks, a Melbourne importer of plumbing and gas fitting supplies. His Melbourne employers regarded him as an excellent worker and extended him 200 pounds credit, supposedly to open a business in Rockhampton, Queensland. The money was never repaid. Deeming is known to have worked for a Sydney gasfitter, where he was charged with theft of brass fittings from his employer. Deeming indignantly denied the theft, but the items were found at his home and he was sentenced to six weeks imprisonment. Deeming pretended to faint when the sentence was pronounced. After his release, he continued to work in Sydney as a gasfitter until, in December 1887, he was again committed for trial, now on a charge of fraudulent insolvency. He disappeared from New South Wales while on bail.

Deeming was accompanied by his wife while in Australia, "a typical Welsh lass", Marie (née James). Deeming had married her in Lower Tranmere, England in February 1881 and they had lived briefly at Birkenhead before leaving for Melbourne. His brother Alfred, had married Marie's sister, Martha. By 1886 Deeming and Marie had two Australian-born daughters, Bertha and Marie. In 1888 his brothers Alfred and Walter learned that Deeming and his family were returning to England "with a considerable fortune".

South Africa and return to England
Later police and newspaper research discovered Deeming had been active in Cape Town, South Africa in 1888–1889, but his exact movements at this time are unclear and it appears he returned to Birkenhead, England, at least once. Marie had another child at this time. He was known to have been involved in conducting a Transvaal diamond mine swindle in 1889. His return to England via the steamship Yumna was well remembered by the Captain and passengers because of his ostentatious display of jewellery and money, and his unwanted attention to some of the female passengers.

He had arrived at Hull by November 1889, lodging in the nearby town of Beverley. Here he passed himself off as "a retired sheep farmer" named Harry Lawson from Mount House Farm, Rockhampton, Queensland, living on 1,500 pounds a year. He wooed Helen Matheson, the 21-year-old daughter of his landlady and married her, bigamously, on 18 February 1890. About a month later, after a honeymoon in the south of England, he suddenly disappeared, taking his expensive gifts to Matheson with him. Deeming's wife and extended family had heard of his bigamous marriage to Matheson according to Gurvich and Wray.

Deeming was later found to have then visited Marie and his (now) four children in Birkenhead. He apparently gave Marie several hundred pounds and announced he was leaving for South America. He would send for her and the children once he was settled. Before leaving he conducted another swindle at a jeweler's in Hull. He was arrested for this on arrival at Montevideo and extradited back to England on a charge of "obtaining goods by false pretenses" being sentenced to nine months prison.

Rainhill
On his release from prison in July 1891, Deeming headed to the Liverpool area, settling into a hotel in the village of Rainhill, Merseyside under the name Albert Williams. A mysterious woman (almost certainly his wife Marie) who appeared at the hotel was dismissed as his "sister", visiting before she left for Port Said. Deeming then took a lease on Dinham Villa, a house in Rainhill, supposedly on behalf of a military friend, a certain "Colonel Brookes". However, Deeming himself took up residence at Dinham Villa, while a woman and several children were seen at the house and were again dismissed as merely his "sister and her children" visiting, who had "since returned home". Shortly afterward, Deeming complained that the drains at Dinham Villa were defective, and the kitchen floor needed to be replaced. He closely supervised the work on the floor.

While in Rainhill, Deeming began to court Emily Lydia Mather, the daughter of a widowed local shopkeeper, Mrs. Dove Mather. Mather and Deeming (as Albert Williams) married on 22 September 1891.

Windsor murder
In November 1891, Deeming (still using the name Williams) took Mather to Australia in the German steamship Kaiser Wilhelm II. They arrived in Melbourne on 15 December 1891. Deeming rented a house on Andrew Street in Windsor, a suburb of Melbourne. On 24 December or early on 25 December 1891, he murdered Mather and buried her under the hearthstone of one of the bedrooms, covering the body with cement. He had paid a month's rent in advance, giving the name Mr. Drewn, but almost immediately left the property. The owner, nearby butcher John Stamford, had been happy to rent to the man, because of his air of respectability, and at first, had not even known the man's name.

On 3 March 1892 a prospective tenant of the Windsor house complained of "a disagreeable smell" in the second bedroom. The owner and estate agent later raised the hearthstone to investigate whereupon the smell became so overpowering "they found themselves barely able to breathe". The police were called and Mather's body found.  A postmortem conducted on 4 March found that although her skull had been fractured by several blows, the most likely cause of death was that her throat had been cut. 

Publicity surrounding the gruesome finding of Mather's body was considerable. Within a few days, The Age newspaper had connected the murder to the Whitechapel murders of London:

From clues found at the vacant Andrew Street house and from information provided by local tradespeople, including Stamford and his agent, a local laundress, an ironmonger who sold Deeming cement and several carriers, investigating Victoria Police sergeants William Considine and Henry Cawsey were able to trace the recently arrived Mr. Williams to the Kaiser Wilhelm II. They were then able to interview other passengers, who gave corroborating descriptions of Mr. Williams and Mather. In the weeks at sea, Mather had talked to other passengers of her family at Rainhill, and the connection was now made. Deeming's behaviour as Mr. Williams had also attracted considerable attention during the voyage. Many passengers stated they "detested Williams, [but] all agreed he had treated his wife in a loving and considerate manner". Police now also had a very good description of Mr. Williams, which they circulated to other Australian colonies, but at this stage, his real identity was still unknown.

At an inquest held on 8 March, it was discovered that a man answering Mr. Williamss description had auctioned a variety of household goods, possibly wedding presents, in the city in early January 1892. At this time he was staying at the Cathedral Hotel in Swanston Street, Melbourne, registered as Mr. Duncan. It later transpired that Deeming had also written an affectionate letter (as Albert Williams) to Mather's mother several days after Mather's murder. Deeming had found time to approach Holt's Matrimonial Agency (as Duncan), wishing to meet a young lady with matrimonial intentions. He had also found time to swindle a local Melbourne jeweller.

Capture
In the meantime, on or about 12 January 1892, Deeming had travelled to Sydney, and was now using the name Baron Swanston. During the voyage and in Sydney Deeming met and courted Kate Rounsefell. He told Rounsefell that if she agreed to become his wife, "she would never regret it, and would always congratulate herself on having entered into matrimony with him". After a whirlwind romance, during which Deeming gave Rounsefell several items of what was later shown to be stolen Melbourne jewellery, Rounsefell consented to marry Baron Swanston. Having also agreed to follow him to Western Australia, Rounsefell and Deeming parted company. By means of forged testimonials, Deeming had obtained a position at a mine at Southern Cross.

On 22 January 1892 Baron Swanston departed for Fremantle. Again, Deeming as Baron Swanston made a name for himself on the ship, boasting of his wealth and position in society. He made approaches to Miss Maude Beech, a young woman in the care of her uncle and aunt, Mr. and Mrs. Wakeley. In this case, Deeming's charm came to nothing. Mr. Wakeley told Swanston; "I may tell you plainly, that I don't believe your stories and I am not in the habit of allowing men of your class to enter my family circle." Once settled at Southern Cross, Deeming maintained a barrage of pleas to Rounsefell, writing on 8 February; "Don't keep me waiting dear. If you love me half as much as I love you, you would not keep me waiting a day". 

Police were closing in, however, and following telegrams by Victoria Police to Western Australia, Deeming was arrested at Southern Cross on 12 March 1892. He began by denying he was Deeming but later said "I think I know the party who has been murdered. I don't believe anyone would have the heart to murder a girl like that". Found in his possession at the time of the arrest were a number of Mather's belongings, including her prayer book.

At about the same time Deeming was being returned to Melbourne, news of the discovery of the Rainhill murders in England arrived in Australia.

Rainhill murders
Following publicity surrounding the discovery of Mather's body at Windsor, investigations at Rainhill revealed the decomposing bodies of Marie Deeming and the four children; Bertha (aged 10), Mary (7), Sidney (5) and Leala (18 months) buried beneath the re-concreted floor of Dinham Villa. The throats of most had been cut (Bertha had been strangled). The murder and burials had apparently occurred while Deeming (as Albert Williams) was courting Mather, on or about 26 July 1891. At an inquest held at Rainhill on 18 March 1892, Deeming's brothers identified Marie and gave some accounts of his activities.

The Rainhill murders had gone undetected for eight months. It appears Deeming's brothers and Marie's sister had been led to believe that Marie and the children were in Brighton on a holiday and then assumed they were overseas again. Deeming had made several visits to Birkenhead to reassure Martha that her sister and the children were well. Detection of the murders was also obstructed by Deeming's lease (as Williams) on Dinham Villa, which stipulated that the house should not be sold or relet for six months, because of the imminent arrival of Colonel Brookes and/or Williams''' sister. The lease also allowed Williams to resurface the concrete floor.

Trial and execution
Furious demonstrations against Deeming were made on the journey to Perth, and again on the way to Albany. Deeming was tried at Melbourne Supreme Court on 25 April 1892. The prosecution case was conducted by Robert Walsh, Q.C. Alfred Deakin, his counsel (later Prime Minister of Australia), tried to mount a plea of insanity. The defence also questioned the impact of newspaper reporting of Deeming on the jury.

Perhaps wishing to aid the defence of insanity, Deeming also claimed to have caught syphilis in London and to have received visitations from his mother's spirit, which urged his actions.  Before the jury retired, Deeming made a "lengthy,... rambling, speech of self-justification".  He repeated a story he had told police that Emily had "run off with another man". "That is my one comfort...knowing that she is not dead".

Deeming was found guilty as charged, however. Deeming spent the last days writing his autobiography and poetry; "The Jury listened well to the yarn I had to tell, But they sent me straight to hell." He also spent time talking to the Church of England ministers, to whom he supposedly confessed. The sentence of the court was confirmed by the Executive Council on 9 May 1892 and the judicial committee of the Privy Council refused leave to appeal on 19 May 1892. The autobiography which Deeming wrote in jail was destroyed.

Aftermath

A family acquaintance of the Mather family, Edward Thunderbolt, Melbourne's Inspector of Public Nuisances, arranged a public subscription, and erected a monument to Emily Mather at Melbourne General Cemetery.

Jack the Ripper theory

As Australians struggled to comprehend the savageness of the Windsor murder, significant press speculation grew, suggesting Deeming was Jack the Ripper. The speculation was also found in overseas reports of the case. For example, on 17 March 1892 The New York Times reported the story with the headlines:

Deeming's movements at many stages of his career are obscure, but it appears he may have been in England in late 1888, the time of the Whitechapel murders. Kreitmayer's Melbourne waxworks of 1912 probably reflected widespread public opinion when it depicted in wax Deeming burying Mather, commenting that it was suspected he was "identical with Jack the Ripper". Speculation that Deeming was Jack the Ripper continues today and Robin Napper a former Scotland Yard detective and currently forensic researcher, along with a team of researchers, came to the conclusion that most of the evidence leads to Deeming as Jack the Ripper.

This aired on a Discovery Channel documentary in 2011. According to Napper the display of Deeming's death mask as that of "Jack the Ripper" in the Scotland Yard Museum of Crime shows that the police had, in fact, always considered him a prime suspect. The reason that the police officially dismissed Deeming as a suspect of the Whitechapel murders, according to Napper, is that they had believed he was either in jail at the time according to some or that he was in South Africa according to others. The Last Podcast on the Left'' lists Deeming as one of two "reasonable" Jack the Ripper suspects.

Deeming's death mask is on display at the Old Melbourne Gaol in Melbourne, where he was executed, and at the Black Museum at New Scotland Yard.

See also
List of serial killers by country

Notes

References

External links

 Contemporary news article pertaining to Frederick Deeming
Bigamy, Theft and Murder: The Extraordinary Tale of Frederick Bailey Deeming, an online exhibition at Public Record Office Victoria.
Examination of remains by William Colin Mackenzie to determine Deeming's connexion with apes
Dictionary of Australian Biography entry by Percy Serle

1853 births
1891 murders in Australia
1892 deaths
19th-century Australian criminals
19th-century English criminals
Australian mass murderers
Australian murderers of children
Australian people convicted of murder
English emigrants to Australia
English mass murderers
English serial killers
Executed Australian people
Executed Australian serial killers
Executed mass murderers
Executed people from Leicestershire
Familicides
Gasfitters
Jack the Ripper suspects
Male serial killers
People convicted of murder by Victoria (Australia)
People executed by Australian colonies by hanging
People executed by Victoria (Australia)
People executed for murder
People from Ashby-de-la-Zouch